The 1977 European Championship can refer to European Championships held in several sports:

 1977 European Rugby League Championship
 Eurobasket 1977